Levelle Desean Brown (born July 5, 1977) is a former American professional football player.  He was born in Winfield, Illinois. He is the older brother of Chris Brown, running back of the Houston Texans of the National Football League.

High school and college
Levelle Brown attended Naperville North High School in Naperville, Illinois, where he played football, basketball, and ran track. After graduating, he attended Northwestern University. And he also played basketball.

Career
Brown played fullback for the Nashville Kats and the Chicago Rush of the Arena Football League (AFL).

External links
AFL stats

1977 births
Living people
American football fullbacks
Northwestern Wildcats football players
Nashville Kats players
Chicago Rush players
Sportspeople from Naperville, Illinois
Players of American football from Illinois